Maija Einfelde (born 2 January 1939) is a Latvian composer.

Biography
Maija Einfelde was born in Valmiera, Latvia, and began her music studies with her mother who was a church organist. She continued her education at Alfrēds Kalniņš Music School in Cēsis, at Jāzeps Mediņš Music College in Riga, and then entered the Conservatoire of Latvia in 1966, studying composition with Jānis Ivanovs. After graduating, she has taught music theory and composition at Alfrēds Kalniņš Music School in Cēsis, Emīls Dārziņš Music College and Jāzeps Mediņš Music College. She has one son, writer Jānis Einfelds.

Einfelde's works have been performed internationally, including performances by the MDR Rundfunkchor at the Berliner Philharmonie, Brigham Young University Choir, the Vancouver Chamber Choir, the Kansas City Chorale in USA, the Radio Choir of the Netherlands, and at Carnegie Hall, New York City.

Honors and awards
First Prize, Barlow Endowment for Music Competition, 1997
Grand Music Prize of Latvia, 1997
Award of the Ministry of Culture of the Republic of Latvia, 1999

Works
Einfelde composes mainly choral, organ and chamber music.  Selected works include:
1982 Sonāte meditācija (Sonata-Meditation) for viola and piano
1985 Second Sonata for violin and piano
1989 Crucifixus for solo organ
1990 Lullaby, for women's choir
1993 String Quartet for two violin, viola and violoncello
1994 Ave Maria for organ
1994 Adagio for violin, cello, and piano
1994 Pirms saules rieta (Before the Sunset) for clarinet, viola and piano
1995 Ave Maria for woman's choir and organ
1996 Pie zemes tālās... (At the Edge of the Earth...), chamber oratorio for mixed choir
1998 Ave Maria for mixed choir and organ
1998 Psalm 15 for mixed choir
1999 Sanctus for solo organ
1999 Prelūdija (Prelude) for oboe and viola
2000 Skerco (Scherzo) for solo violoncello
2002 Noktirne (Nocturne) for harp
2003 Cikls ar Friča Bārdas dzeju (Three Poems by Fricis Bārda) for mixed choir
2006 Divas mīlas dziemsas (Two Love Songs) 12 voices
2002 Symphony

Her compositions have been recorded and issued on CD including:

No Tevis (From You) // Female Choir Dzintars – 1995, Riga Recording Studio
Ave Maria // Female Choir Dzintars – [1996/97]
Trīs jūras dziesmas (Three Songs of the Sea) for oboe, French horn, and string orchestra // Rīgas kamermūziķi [Compilation of 20th Century Latvian music] – 1998, BRIZE
Gloria for piccolo trumpet and organ / mit Edwart H. Tarr, Irmtraud Krüger, 1998, KREUZ PLUS: MUSIK, BEST. NR. 1627
Pie zemes tālās... (At the Edge of the Earth…) / Latvian Radio Chamber Singers, Conductor Kaspars Putniņš – [Author CD] – 1999
15th Psalm / Latvian Radio Choir, Conductor Sigvards Kļava – 8'49" / Latviešu mūzika Rīgā – 1999
Maija balāde (May Ballad) // Latvian Millennium Classics – 2000, UPE CLASSICS
Noktirne (Nocturne) / Divejāda saule tek. Latvian New Music – 2003, LR CD 043
Monologs (Monologue) for cello and piano // Spēlē Māris Villerušs CD 1 – 2003
Dramatiskais dialogs // Negaidīta atklāsme (Unexpected Inspiration) – 2003, Riga Recording Company
Sirēnu sala (The Isle of the Sirens) / Vocal ensemble Putni, artistic leader Antra Dreģe  // Vokālais ansamblis Putni. Pamošanās – 2003, PUTNI
Sonata for Violin and Organ / Jānis Bulavs and Larisa Bulava // Latvian New Music. Latviešu jaunā mūzika – 2004, Jānis Bulavs [recorded in Canada] // Saules lēkts – 2005, LMIC& Latvian Radio Choir, LMIC CD-2005-3
Ave Maria // Latvian String Quartets. Latviešu stīgu kvarteti – 2008

References

1939 births
Living people
People from Valmiera
Music educators
20th-century classical composers
Latvian composers
Women classical composers
Women music educators
20th-century women composers